Symplocos is a genus of flowering plants in the order Ericales. It contains about 300 species distributed in Asia and the Americas. Many species grow in humid tropical regions. This is sometimes considered to be the only genus in family Symplocaceae. Plants in this family are shrubs and trees with white or yellow flowers. The oldest fossils of the genus date to the lower Eocene of Europe and North America, with the genus being present in Europe as late as the Pliocene.

Selected species

 Symplocos adenophylla
 Symplocos ampulliformis — Northeast Queensland, Australia
 Symplocos anamallayana
 Symplocos anomala
 Symplocos austromexicana — deciduous shrub up to 2m; narrow endemic, Oaxaca, Mexico
 Symplocos badia
 Symplocos baehnii
 Symplocos barberi
 Symplocos bauerlenii — shrub or small tree up to 7m; eastern Australia
 Symplocos blancae
 Symplocos bractealis
 Symplocos breedlovei
 Symplocos calycodactylos
 Symplocos candelabrum — tree up to 13m; Lord Howe Island
 Symplocos canescens
 Symplocos carmencitae
 Symplocos chloroleuca
 Symplocos clethrifolia
 Symplocos citrea
 Symplocos coccinea
 Symplocos cochinchinensis
 var. cochinchinensis
 var. gittonsii — Northeast Queensland, Australia
 var. glaberrima — Northeast Queensland, Australia
 var. pilosiuscula — Northeast Queensland, Australia
 Symplocos cordifolia — Sri Lanka
 Symplocos coreana — Korean sweetleaf, deciduous shrub up to 5m; Japan, Korea
 Symplocos coronata — Sri Lanka
 Symplocos costaricana – Central America
 Symplocos costata
 Symplocos crassiramifera — Northeast Queensland, Australia
 Symplocos cuneata — Sri Lanka
 Symplocos cyanocarpa — Northeast Queensland, Australia
 Symplocos ecuadorica – Ecuador
 Symplocos fuscata
 Symplocos glauca — evergreen tree up to 15m; Japan, Taiwan, China, Indochina
 Symplocos graniticola — Northeast Queensland, Australia
 Symplocos hayesii — Northeast Queensland, Australia
 Symplocos henschelii
 Symplocos hispidula
 Symplocos hylandii — Northeast Queensland, Australia
 Symplocos junghuhnii
 †Symplocos kowalewskii Baltic amber, Eocene
 Symplocos lancifolia — evergreen tree up to 5m; Japan
 Symplocos longipes
 Symplocos lucida — China, Japan, Taiwan, South Asia, Malesia
 Symplocos lugubris
 Symplocos mezii
 Symplocos myrtacea — evergreen tree up to 10m; Japan
 Symplocos nairii
 Symplocos nivea
 Symplocos octopetala
 Symplocos oligandra
 Symplocos paniculata — (sapphireberry) — deciduous shrub up to 8m; Japan, South Korea; popular as an ornamental plant
 Symplocos paucistaminea — Northeast Queensland, Australia
 Symplocos pendula
 Symplocos peruviana
 Symplocos pluribracteata
 Symplocos prunifolia — evergreen tree]up to 10m; Japan, Korea
 Symplocos pulchra — Sri Lanka
 Symplocos pyriflora
 Symplocos racemosa — China, South Asia
 Symplocos rimbachii
 Symplocos shilanensis
 Symplocos sousae
 Symplocos stawellii — shrub or small tree up to 30m; eastern Australia
 var. montana — Northeast Queensland, Australia
 var. stawellii — Australia
 Symplocos subandina
 Symplocos subintegra Chatterjee
 Symplocos tacanensis
 Symplocos tanakae — evergreen tree; Japan
 Symplocos theophrastaefolia — evergreen tree up to 15m; Japan, Taiwan, China
 Symplocos thwaitesii — shrub or small tree up to 17m; eastern Australia
 Symplocos tinctoria — (sweetleaf, horse-sugar, yellowwood) — deciduous or evergreen shrub or tree up to 6m; United States
 Symplocos trichoclada
 Symplocos truncata
 Symplocos tubulifera
 Symplocos verrucisurcula
 Symplocos versicolor

References

 
Ericales genera